Scopula latelineata is a moth of the family Geometridae. It is found in Russia, Kazakhstan and Mongolia.

References

Moths described in 1892
latelineata
Moths of Asia